Askino is the name of two rural localities in the Republic of Bashkortostan, Russia:
Askino, Arkhangelsky District, Republic of Bashkortostan, a village in Arkhangelsky District
Askino, Askinsky District, Republic of Bashkortostan, a selo in Askinsky District